Eon Mountain is located on the border of Alberta and British Columbia on the Continental Divide. It is Alberta's 41st-highest peak, and the 53rd-highest peak in British Columbia. It was named in 1901 by James Outram.

The first ascent of Eon was made on July 17, 1921, by Winthrop E. Stone, then President of Purdue University, who fell to his death shortly after reaching the summit. Stone had climbed the final chimney and then unroped on the summit. Upon returning to the chimney he stepped on a loose stone near the edge and fell. His wife was stationed at the base of the final chimney at the time.


Geology

The mountain is composed of sedimentary rock laid down during the Precambrian to Jurassic periods. Formed in shallow seas, this sedimentary rock was pushed east and over the top of younger rock during the Laramide orogeny.

Climate

Based on the Köppen climate classification, Eon Mountain is located in a subarctic climate zone with cold, snowy winters, and mild summers. Temperatures can drop below −20 °C with wind chill factors below −30 °C.

Gallery

See also
List of peaks on the Alberta–British Columbia border

References

Eon Mountain
Eon Mountain
Canadian Rockies